James "JJ" Metcalf (born 27 July 1988) is an English professional boxer. He held the Commonwealth super-welterweight title in 2019 and challenged for the British super-welterweight title in March 2021. He is the son of former boxer Shea Neary.

Professional career
Metcalf made his professional debut on 3 December 2011, scoring a four-round points decision (PTS) victory over Kevin McCauley at the Robin Park Centre in Wigan, England.

After compiling a record of 17–0 (9 KOs) he was scheduled to face Jorge Fortea for the vacant WBC International super-welterweight title on 9 June 2018 at the Manchester Arena, as part of the undercard of Tyson Fury's comeback fight against Sefer Seferi. In the week leading up to the fight, Fortea withdrew from the contest with Aitor Nieto stepping in as a late replacement. Metcalf defeated Nieto via twelfth-round technical knockout (TKO) to capture the WBC International title.

He was scheduled to return to the Manchester Arena to defend his title against former British and Commonwealth super-welterweight champion, Liam Williams, on 22 December 2018 on the undercard of the Josh Warrington vs. Carl Frampton world title fight. The fight was put in jeopardy after Metcalf suffered an ankle injury. He told promoter Frank Warren that he would inform Warren six weeks prior to the fight whether or not he was fit to go ahead. However, after Warren had lined up a potential replacement for Williams in the event of Metcalf pulling out, Williams decided to instead fight the replacement, Mark Heffron, for the vacant British middleweight title. Metcalf had expressed his intention to go ahead with the bout.

After the fight with Williams failed to materialise, Metcalf's next fight came against Santos Medrano in April 2019 in a non-title fight, with Metcalf scoring a KO victory in the eighth and final round. After suffering a hand injury in the fight with Medrano, it was expected that Metcalf would not fight again until the end of the year. However, he was scheduled to face former British middleweight champion and former world title challenger, Jason Welborn, for the vacant Commonwealth super-welterweight title on 15 June 2019 at the First Direct Arena in Leeds, again on a Josh Warrington undercard, this time in a world title defence against Kid Galahad. In a fight which saw Metcalf receive a point deduction for repeated low blows, he scored a KO in the eighth round with a left hook to the body to capture the Commonwealth title.

After a TKO victory against Jan Balog in February 2020, Metcalf challenged Ted Cheeseman for the vacant British super-welterweight title on 27 March, at the Europa Point Sports Complex in Gibraltar. The bout was a part of the undercard of Alexander Povetkin vs. Dillian Whyte II, and was televised live on Sky Sports Box Office. In a closely contested fight, Metcalf was hurt and left on unsteady legs in the fourth, but was able to see out the remainder of the round. Metcalf twice returned the favour, hurting Cheeseman in the sixth and eleventh rounds. After hurting Cheeseman in the eleventh, the latter came back with a combination of punches to knock Metcalf to the canvas. He made it back to his feet on unsteady legs, prompting referee Ian John Lewis to call a halt to the contest, handing Metcalf the first defeat of his career via TKO.

Professional boxing record

References

Living people
1988 births
English male boxers
Boxers from Liverpool
Light-middleweight boxers
Commonwealth Boxing Council champions